It's Only Rock 'n' Roll is the first full-length album by Swedish hard rock band Hardcore Superstar. It was released only in Sweden. Many songs were re-recorded in the following album, Bad Sneakers and a Piña Colada.

Track listing 
 "Hello/Goodbye" - 2:49
 "Baby Come Along" - 3:06
 "Send Myself To Hell" - 2:17
 "Bubblecum Ride" - 2:43
 "Rock 'N' Roll Star" - 3:35
 "Someone Special" - 5:26
 "Dig A Hole" - 2:39
 "Punk Rock Song" - 3:21
 "Right Here, Right Now" - 4:03
 "So Deep Inside" 3:21
 "Fly Away" 4:13

References

1998 debut albums
Hardcore Superstar albums